Daniel Erskine McIvor, CM (30 August 1911 – 24 February 2005) was a Canadian aviation pioneer whose long and storied career was crowned by his work with the Martin Mars water bombers. McIvor Lake on northern Vancouver Island near Campbell River is named after him. He was the son of Canadian Member of Parliament Dan McIvor Sr.

In 2003, he was made a Member of the Order of Canada for having "developed water bombing techniques that have saved thousands of acres of forest in British Columbia." He was also inducted into the British Columbia and Canadian Aviation Halls of Fame for his work on the Mars conversion.

References

1911 births
2005 deaths
Canadian aviators
Members of the Order of Canada